Discocnide is a monotypic genus of flowering plants belonging to the family Urticaceae. The only species is Discocnide mexicana.

Its native range is Mexico to Central America.

References

Urticaceae
Urticaceae genera
Monotypic Rosales genera